Social Democratic Front may refer to:

 Social Democratic Front (Cameroon), the main opposition party of Cameroon
 Social Democratic Front (Ghana), a former political party in Ghana (1979–1981)

See also 
 

eo:Socia-Demokrata Fronto